In Scandinavian mythology, Huld is only referenced by völva or seiðkona, that is a woman who practiced the seiðr. She is mentioned in the Ynglinga saga, Sturlunga saga and a late medieval Icelandic tale. In the latter source, she is Odin's mistress and the mother of the demi-goddesses Þorgerðr and Irpa. As her name suggests, Huld may be in origin the same being as the Hulder and the German Holda.

Attestations
In the Ynglinga saga it is related that she was first hired to kill the Swedish king Vanlade, by his wife Drífa. She "hag-rode" him to death. 

Snorri also quoted some lines from Ynglingatal composed in the 9th century:

Later she was hired by Vanlade's grandchildren to kill his son Visbur.

It is said in Sturlunga saga that Sturla Þórðarson entertained King Magnús lagabœtir with a story about Huld in 1263, which he told "better and more cleverly than any of those present had heard before" (betr ok fróðligar en nokkurr þeira hafði fyrr heyrt, er þar váru). According to Sturlunga saga, the story was about a great troll-woman and was well received by the king's followers and by the queen; it took a good part of the day to tell.

Notes

Sources
Ynglinga saga

Witchcraft in folklore and mythology
Legendary Norsemen
Characters in Norse mythology